Incheon is divided into 8 districts("gu") and 2 counties ("gun").

Districts
Districts with population data from 2015:

References

See also 
 Incheon
 Administrative divisions of South Korea

 
 
Incheon